Since 2009, BBC Books have published several short story anthologies based on the TV series Doctor Who. Unlike their novels and audiobooks, which are published under the title of New Series Adventures, or their previous short story range Short Trips (1998–2000), these books are not considered part of a series, but are published irregularly and generally as stand-alones.

Previously, BBC had licensed out the rights to produce original prose fiction based on Doctor Who twice: to Virgin Publishing from 1994 to 1997, who published short story collections under the title Decalog; and to Big Finish Productions (better known for producing audio plays based on Doctor Who since 1999) from 2002 to 2009, who published their own line also titled Short Trips.

The Doctor Who Stories (2009)
A book containing fourteen stories, with one of each previously appearing in each fourteen volumes of the Doctor Who Files series (published by BBC Children's Books), and another, previously unpublished, story.

Tales of Trenzalore: The Eleventh Doctor's Last Stand (2014)
All these stories take place during the Eleventh Doctor's centuries-long defence of the town of Christmas on the planet Trenzalore, as depicted in the 2013 Christmas special "The Time of the Doctor".

The Shakespeare Notebooks (2014)
Following the Tenth Doctor's encounter with William Shakespeare as depicted in the 2007 episode "The Shakespeare Code", this anthology is presented as a series of found documents, mostly alternative drafts to or author's notes about Shakespeare's plays, that demonstrate encounters with or visions of the Doctor.

All stories were written (without individual authorship being given) by James Goss, Julian Richards, Justin Richards and Matthew Sweet.

Time Trips (2015)
These stories were first published as a series of e-books, appearing every month or so in 2014. The hardcover collected edition features an additional, original story printed on the dust jacket.

The Scientific Secrets of Doctor Who (2015)
A guide to some scientific elements of the Doctor Who universe, this volume featured a short story accompanying each chapter.

The Time Lord Letters (2015)

The Dangerous Book of Monsters (2015)

Time Lord Fairy Tales (2015)

The Legends of Ashildr (2015)
Stories of Ashildr, the woman who lived, in the many years between the Doctor's first two encounters with her in "The Girl Who Died" and "The Woman Who Lived". Authors are Justin Richards, James Goss, David Llewellyn and Jenny Colgan.

The Legends of River Song (2016)
Five stories featuring the adventures of River Song, the Doctor's time-travelling wife, both with and without the Doctor. The stories' authors are Jenny Colgan, Jacqueline Rayner, Steve Lyons, Guy Adams and Andy Lane.

Twelve Doctors of Christmas (2016)

The American Adventures (2016)
Six stories, all written by Justin Richards, depicting adventures the Twelfth Doctor takes between his travels with Clara Oswald, and all taking place in the United States at various points in the nineteenth, twentieth and twenty-first centuries.

Myths and Legends (2017)
Stories based on Greek myths, presented as a collection of myths from many worlds in a Time Lord archive. All stories were written by Richard Dinnick.

Tales of Terror (2017)
Promoted as Hallowe'en stories, they focus on aspects of monsters and horror.

The Missy Chronicles (2018)
These stories tell of Missy's adventures mostly outside of those where her path crosses with the Doctor's.

Twelve Angels Weeping (2018)
Stories featuring monsters from the series, themed around the countdown of "The Twelve Days of Christmas". The anthology was written by Dave Rudden.

The Target Storybook (2019)
These stories are explicitly meant to be linked to televised stories through in-universe elements and characters.

Star Tales (2019)
Stories where the Doctor encounters famous figures from Earth's history, based on the Doctor's propensity to name-drop.

The Wintertime Paradox (2020)
A second Christmas-themed anthology by author Dave Rudden. An additional linking story, "Canaries", first released online and included in the e-book version, tied into the Time Lord Victorious multimedia storyline.

Anthologies
Stories